Nazik Saba Yared (born 11 April 1928 in Jerusalem, Palestine) is a Lebanese novelist and academic, a former professor and a writer. She is the daughter of Alexander and Hala (Maalouf) Saba. She was married to late Ibrahim Yared and has three children and four grandchildren.

She earned her degree in philosophy from Fu'ād al-Awwal University in Cairo followed by a Master and a Ph.D. in Arabic Literature from the American University of Beirut.

She first taught Arabic literature at the French Protestant College Collège Protestant Français in Beirut and later from 1978 to 1998 at the Lebanese American University in Beirut.

Works
حماد عجرد  Dār al-Fikr al-Lubnān, 1983 
 الصدى المخنوق :: رواية /  مؤسسة نوفل،, 1986 
Taqasim ‘ala watarin da’i’ (Improvisations on a missing string). Beirut: Naufal Group. 1992
 
Al-dhikrayat al-mulghat. Beirut: Naufal Group. 1998

Dhikrayat lam taktamil. Beirut: Saqi Books. 2008

Non-fiction

 Al-rahhaloun al-`arab wa hadarat al-gharb (Arab travellers and Western Civilization), Beirut: Naufal Group, 1991
Arab travellers and Western Civilization, London: Saqi Books, 1996
	In the Wake of Abu Nuwas (1997)
Anthology and Study of Ibn ar-Rumi's Satirical Poetry, Dar al-Saqi (London, England), 1988.
al-Kātibāt al-Lubnānīyāt: bībliyūghrāfiyā, 1850-1950, Dār al-Sāqī, 2000 
Secularism and the Arab World: (1850-1939), Saqi Books, 26 June 2002, 

Untranslated works https://www.encyclopedia.com/arts/educational-magazines/yared-nazik-saba-1928

Elias Abu-Shabki (literary criticism), Beit al-Hikma (Beirut, Lebanon), 1969.

Ibn ar-Rumi (literary criticism), Beit al-Hikma (Beirut, Lebanon), 1980.

Ahmad Shauqi (literary criticism), Beit al-Hikma (Beirut, Lebanon), 1981.

Hammad Ajrad (literary criticism), Dar al-Fikr al-Lubnani (Beirut, Lebanon), 1983.Nuqtat ad-Da'ira (novel), Dar al-Fikr al-Lubnani (Beirut, Lebanon), 1983.

Assada al-Makhnuq (novel), Naufal (Beirut, Lebanon), 1986.

Kana al-Amsu Ghadan (novel), Naufal (Beirut, Lebanon), 1988.

In the Wake of Abu Nuwas (literary criticism), Naufal (Beirut, Lebanon), 1992.Fi Dhill al-Qal'a (novel), Dar al-Kitab al-Alami (Beirut, Lebanon), 1996.

Al-Dhikrayat al-Mulghat (novel), Naufal (Beirut, Lebanon), 1998.

Ba'idan 'an Dhill al-Qal'a (novel), Dar al-Kitab al-Alami (Beirut, Lebanon), 1998.

(With Nuhá Bayyumi) Al-Katib 'at al-Lubnaniyat: biblioghrafiya, 1850-1950, Saqi (Beirut, Lebanon), 2000.

Ayam Beirut (novel), Dar al-Kitab al-Alami (Beirut, Lebanon), 2002.

Al La'na (novel) Arab Scientific Publishers (Beirut, Lebanon), 2014

Fekdan (novel) Naufal (Beirut, Lebanon), 2018

Reviews
"Reviews", International Journal of Middle East Studies (1998), 30: 317-318 
"Review: Canceled Memories, Story Circle Book Reviews

References
https://www.encyclopedia.com/arts/educational-magazines/yared-nazik-saba-1928

External links
Heather Reyes, (ed) The art of Rawas: conversations with Nazik Yared, Saqi, 2004, 

1928 births
People from Jerusalem
Lebanese novelists
Living people
Palestinian emigrants to Lebanon
American University of Beirut alumni
Academic staff of Lebanese American University
Palestinian women academics